HaAh HaGadol 3 (lit. The Big Brother 3) is the third series of the Israeli version of the reality show Big Brother. The show was first broadcast on 8 December 2010, and ended on 26 March 2011. Differently from the previous seasons, seventeen housemates entered the house at the premiere, instead of sixteen in the previous seasons and another five joining after 50 days. The housemates are competing for a one million shekel prize. The house is located in Neve Ilan, a suburb of Jerusalem.

Housemates

Amir
Amir Goldberg, 28, Metula/Tel Aviv.

Aviram
Aviram Ben Shoshan, 30, Los Angeles/Eilat. He was engaged to the housemate Lihi Griner.

Atay
Atay Schulberg, 27, Jerusalem.

Dana
Dana Ron, 38, Tel Aviv. Dana entered the house on day 1 and was the tenth evicted on day 67.

Elad
Elad Zafani, 21, Tel Aviv.

Frida
Frida Hecht, 46, Tel Aviv.

Hila
Hila Akray, 25, Jerusalem. Hila entered the house on day 50 and was the fourteenth evicted on day 88 with Tomer.

Igal
Igal Alenkri, 50, Ramat Gan. Igal entered the house on day 1 and was the third evicted on day 32.

Jackie 
Yaakov "Jackie" Menahem, 22, Ramat Gan. The winner of the third series.

Liam
Liam Raz, 27, Haifa.

Lihi
Lihi Griner, 26, Los Angeles/Kiryat Ono. She was engaged to the housemate Aviram Ben Shoshan.

Li Oz
Li Oz Cohen, 25, Tel Aviv.

Merav
Merav Batito, 41, Ra'anana.

Nofar
Nofar Mor, 22, Tel Aviv.

Ram
Ram Preiss Sitton, 26, Netanya Chairman of the Green party in Netanya- Wanted to bring the German language and the protection of the Environment into Prime time.

Rinat
Rinat Gitter, 21, Petah Tikva. She is the twin sister of the housemate Shiran Gitter.

Shiran
Shiran Gitter, 21, Petah Tikva. She is the twin sister of the housemate Rinat Gitter.

Sivan A.
Sivan Avrahami, 26, Or Yehuda.

Sivan D.
Sivan Dror, 28, Haifa.

Tomer
Tomer Zrihan, 34, Pardes Hanna-Karkur. Tomer entered the house on day 50 and was the thirteenth evicted on day 88 with Hila.

Yoav
Yoav Maor, 21, Kfar Saba.

Yoram
Yoram Cohen, 49, Ofra. Yoram entered the house on day 1 and was the second evicted on day 22.

Nominations table

Notes

 Shiran, Rinat, Jackie, Igal and Lihi were immune from eviction after winning a secret mission (Hide the fact that Rinat has a twin sister). Later, Elad won a personal mission and was immune instead of Igal.
 Jackie was swapped with Lydia Navarro from Gran Hermano 12 for one week.
 For the first time in this season, two housemates were evicted from the Big Brother house.
 Aviram, Hila, Merav, Ram and Tomer were new housemates and they entered into a private section for their first four days. The old housemates had to choose one of the new housemates who they don't want to be entered into the house. After the vote, Aviram was evicted, and Hila, Merav, Ram and Tomer entered the house.
 Hila, Merav, Ram and Tomer were immune from being nominated because they are new housemates. They had to choose two housemates who they wanted to stay in the house instead of who they wanted to evict.
 As a part of the weekly budget mission of the housemates, Elad had to nominate two housemates publicly. The two housemates (Who are Frida and Amir) are automatically nominated for eviction in addition to the other nominations.
 In week 13, any housemate who got at least one vote, was nominated for eviction.
 There were no nominations in the final week and the public was voting for housemates to win, rather than be evicted. the housemate with the most SMS votes was the winner.

External links
  

2010 Israeli television seasons
2011 Israeli television seasons
03